David M. Jennings (born December 17, 1948) is a former Minnesota politician, a former member of the Republican Party, a former Speaker of the Minnesota House of Representatives, and the former superintendent of Eastern Carver County School District 112, based in Chaska.

Jennings served in the United States Marine Corps for five years and was honorably discharged with the rank of staff-sergeant in December 1972. He received a B.S. degree in political science, magna cum laude, from Minnesota State University, Mankato in 1976. He worked in small construction and as a Congressional staff aide until he was first elected to the Minnesota House of Representatives in 1978.

Jennings rose quickly, becoming minority leader in February 1982. He served in that role until the Independent-Republicans gained a majority in the 1984 elections. He became Speaker of the House in January 1985, a position he held for two years until his departure from the legislature.

Beginning in 1990, Jennings was employed as a corporate executive for Schwan's Food Co., based in Marshall, Minnesota, leaving there in December 1998.

In 1999, Jennings served briefly as Minnesota's Commissioner of Commerce under Governor Jesse Ventura, after which he became CEO of the Minneapolis Regional Chamber of Commerce.  In January 2002, Jennings became Chief Operating Officer of the Minneapolis Public Schools and later served as interim superintendent of the Minneapolis school district from October 2003 to June 2004. He was considered for permanent appointment, but withdrew from consideration after the appointment process was criticized. He went on to serve as deputy director of operations for the Minnesota Historical Society for one year, before accepting a permanent appointment as superintendent of schools for the Eastern Carver County School District, based in Chaska in July 2005. He is married and has one son.

References

External links

Speakers of the Minnesota House of Representatives
Minnesota School District 112

1948 births
Speakers of the Minnesota House of Representatives
Republican Party members of the Minnesota House of Representatives
Living people
Minnesota State University, Mankato alumni
American chief operating officers
People from Martin County, Minnesota